Samuel Dinsmore may refer to:

Samuel Dinsmoor (1766–1835), American politician, U.S. Congressman and Governor of New Hampshire
Samuel Dinsmoor, Jr. (1799–1869), American banker, Governor of New Hampshire
Samuel P. Dinsmoor (1843–1932), eccentric American sculptor and landscape designer